Komaranahalli  is a village in the southern state of Karnataka, India.

It is said that, Komaranahalli is one place where metallurgy of iron was done in ancient India during 1200-1000 BC.

See also
 Ballari
 Districts of Karnataka

References

External links
 http://Bellary.nic.in/

Villages in Bellary district